Stanghow is a village in the borough of Redcar and Cleveland and the ceremonial county of North Yorkshire, England. The place name Stanghow is thought to derive from the Old Norse meaning Stong-how meaning pole hill. How or Howe, deriving from the Old Norse word haugr meaning a hill, is a common element in Yorkshire place name.

It has won Britain in Bloom twice, in 2010 and 2012.

Education Statistics 
These is for the highest level education obtained by the residents of Stanghow and are from the UK Census of 2011. Stanghow has a high level of residents with either no qualifications or qualifications equal to 1 or more GCSE at grade D or below than the national average.

References

External links

Villages in North Yorkshire
Places in the Tees Valley
Redcar and Cleveland